Lucien Delfour (born 22 December 1988) is a French-Australian slalom canoeist who has competed at the international level since 2006. He represented France in the 2006 season. Since 2010 he has represented Australia. 

Delfour qualified for the 2020 Tokyo Olympics.He completed his heats and semi-final successfully with an excellent time of 91.12 in his heats second run the highlight. Delfour finished 8th in the final of the Men's slalom K1 event with a time of 102.33.

Early years 
Delfour was born in Papeete in French Polynesia, He has the nickname 'Lulu'  and started canoeing in 1997 at the age of 8.

Delfour enjoyed both the slalom and downriver disciplines but had to make a choice. From the age of 14 he decided to focus solely on slalom. He won silver in the 2006 European Junior Championships in Nottingham, Great Britain 

In 2010, Delfour moved to Australia and four years later became an Australian citizen.

Achievements 
Training under Julien Billaut, Delfour secured the single men's Rio 2016 K1 canoe slalom spot after a head-to-head battle with Australian Jaxon Merritt at the 2016 Oceania Championships.

Delfour participated at two Olympic Games. His first appearance was at the 2016 Summer Olympics in Rio de Janeiro where he finished in 17th place in the K1 event.

Delfour won several medals at the Canoe Slalom World Cup, placing second overall in 2015 in the K1 class.

World Cup individual podiums

References

External links 

 
 

1988 births
Living people
People from Papeete
Canoeists at the 2016 Summer Olympics
Olympic canoeists of Australia
Australian male canoeists
French male canoeists
Canoeists at the 2020 Summer Olympics